Trucker is a 2008 independent drama film by Plum Pictures written and directed by James Mottern, and produced by Scott Hanson, Galt Niederhoffer, Celine Rattray and Daniela Taplin Lundberg. It stars Michelle Monaghan, Nathan Fillion and Benjamin Bratt.

Plot
Diane Ford (Michelle Monaghan) is a long-haul truck driver. She spends her off time having one-night stands and drinking with her married neighbor, Runner (Nathan Fillion), who's in love with her. Her routine life is upset when her ex-husband Len (Benjamin Bratt) sends their 11-year-old son Peter (Jimmy Bennett) to stay with her while he is fighting against cancer.

Cast
 Michelle Monaghan as Diane Ford
 Nathan Fillion as Runner
 Benjamin Bratt as Leonard "Len" Bonner
 Joey Lauren Adams as Jenny Bell
 Jimmy Bennett as Peter Bonner
 Bryce Johnson as Rick
 Matthew Lawrence as Scott
 Brandon Hanson as Tom
 Maya McLaughlin as Molly
 Ricky Ellison as Robert
 Johnny Simmons as Teenager 1
 Stephen Sowan as Teenager 2
 Dennis Hayden as Trucker
 Mika Boorem as Young Woman
 Franklin Dennis Jones as Jonnie
 Amad Jackson as Doctor

Production
The film was shot on location in Hawthorne, CA, Bloomington, CA, and Mira Loma, CA. Other portions of the film were shot in the Coachella Valley, California.

Trucker had a reported budget of under $1.5 million.

Actress Michelle Monaghan earned her commercial driver's license so she could drive a semi-trailer truck for her role; the movie was shot using authentic footage of her doing so.

Reception
, the film holds a 59% approval rating on Rotten Tomatoes, based on 37 reviews with an average rating of 5.84 out of 10. The website's critics consensus reads: "Excellent performances by Michelle Monaghan and Nathan Fillion and keenly-observed details of small-town life elevate this otherwise predictable and inconsistent melodrama."

Roger Ebert chose it as one of his top ten independent films for 2009.

Awards
List of awards for the film:
 Michelle Monaghan – Excellence in Acting Award – Vail Film Festival
 Winner – Best Narrative Feature Film – Woods Hole Film Festival
 Official Selection Tribeca Film Festival
 Official Selection Austin Film Festival
 Official Selection Oxford Film Festival
 Official Selection Florida Film Festival
 Official Selection Vail Film Festival
 San Diego Film Critics: Best Actress (Michelle Monaghan)

References

External links
 
 

2008 films
2008 drama films
American drama films
Films set in California
Films shot in California
Hawthorne, California
American independent films
Trucker films
2008 independent films
2008 directorial debut films
2000s English-language films
2000s American films